Pwll y wrach or Pwll-y-wrach (Welsh for "pool of the witch")  is a feature on the River Ennig near Talgarth in south Powys, Wales. The river plunges in two separate streams over a lip of hard rock (Bishop's Frome Limestone, formerly known as Psammosteus Limestone) into a pool scoured in the softer mudstones of the underlying Raglan Mudstone formation.

The feature occurs within Cwm Pwll-y-wrach, a deep wooded valley that is a Site of Special Scientific Interest and a nature reserve managed by the Brecknock Wildlife Trust. The trust has established trails within the wood to enable public access.

It is suggested that the name derives from the ancient practice of ducking witches in the plunge pool.

References

External links
 Pwll-y-Wrach at cavinguk.co.uk
 Pwll-y-Wrach at Wildlife Trust of South and West Wales

Waterfalls of the Brecon Beacons National Park
Waterfalls of Powys
Sites of Special Scientific Interest in Brecknock
Talgarth